The Turks and Caicos Reef Fund a 501(c)3 organization was established to help preserve and protect the environment of the "Beautiful by Nature" Turks and Caicos Islands - an environment that draws so many visitors and is critical to the economic and physical survival of the islands themselves. The goal is to dedicate more than 85% of all funds raised through this effort to environmental protection projects each year.

Don Stark and David Stone are the co-founders of the Turks and Caicos Reef Fund.  As visitors to the Turks and Caicos Islands (TCI), which is a British Overseas Territory, for many years and part-time residents for the past several years, both Don and David have seen firsthand the challenges to the marine environment that the Turks and Caicos Islands face such as over-fishing and the impact of major new commercial developments.  The TCI Government is doing what it can through the Department of Environment & Maritime Affairs (DEMA), which is also referred to as the Department of Environment and Coastal Resources.  The TC Reef Fund supplements and complements those efforts.

Fund Raising Initiatives  in Support of Projects
The projects are intended to help educate, protect and monitor the health of the Turks and Caicos Islands' environment, especially coral reefs and their inhabitants around the Turks and Caicos Islands.

Partnerships
The UK Overseas Territories Conservation Forum (UKOTCF) is a UK-based non-governmental organisation which promotes coordinated conservation in the UK Overseas Territories and Crown Dependencies (UKOTs and CDs). It is a not-for-profit organisation supported by grants, donations and subscriptions, and a registered charity and company.

References

Environment of the Turks and Caicos Islands